Season 25: Oprah Behind The Scenes is an American documentary television series. The series began airing on OWN on January 1, 2011 and concluded on August 7, 2011. Each episode follows production for one or two episodes of the final season of The Oprah Winfrey Show, featuring interview segments with Oprah Winfrey and the production staff.  Three special edition episodes produced in house at Harpo were filmed on the Oprah set, featuring Oprah and her producers discussing highlights of the season's episodes with select viewers via Skype.

Episodes

References

Oprah Winfrey
2010s American documentary television series
2011 American television series debuts
2011 American television series endings
English-language television shows
Oprah Winfrey Network original programming